Joseph Benjamin Birdsell (March 30, 1908 – March 5, 1994) of Harvard University and UCLA was an anthropologist who studied Aboriginal Australians.

Early life
Born in South Bend, Indiana, Birdsell earned his degrees at the Massachusetts Institute of Technology and Harvard University.

Australian work
After meeting Australian anthropologist Norman Tindale, of the South Australian Museum and University of Adelaide, in 1936 when Tindale visited the US, Birdsell made his first field study in Australia in 1938. In May 1938, the two men and their wives visited Cummeragunja Aboriginal reserve in New South Wales, as part of an extensive anthropological survey of Aboriginal reserves and missions across Australia. Tindale would study the genealogies, while Birdsell undertook the measuring, and with government support the pair travelled across south-east Australia, parts of Queensland, Western Australia, and Tasmania. and returned periodically to study microevolutionary processes.

Together with Tindale, in field-work over 1938–39 in the Cairns rainforest, he concluded that the Indigenous "pygmy" peoples there, which they collectively called Barrineans, belonged to a group that were genetically distinct from the majority of Australian Aboriginal peoples, perhaps related to the Aboriginal Tasmanians. A photo exists showing Birdsell, (height 6 feet 1 inch), with a 24-year-old male of the Gungganyji tribe (4 feet, 6 inches), taken at the Mona Mona Mission, near Kuranda (This hypothesis was later debunked, although the myth persists among some even today.)

Later career
He completed his doctoral degree at Harvard in 1941.

After teaching briefly at the State College of Washington, he served as an Army Air Corps officer in World War II. He taught anthropology at UCLA from 1948 until his retirement in 1974, continuing his research, and writing many articles and a widely used textbook on human evolution. His lifework was summarised in a monograph published in 1993 by Oxford University Press.

He was awarded a Guggenheim Fellowship in 1946, and several of his field seasons in the Australia were financed by the Carnegie Corporation. He had a productive 50-year collaboration with Tindale. He also collaborated with U.S. physical anthropologist Earnest Hooton, who was professor at Harvard when he was a graduate student.

Death and legacy
He died on March 5, 1994, in Santa Barbara of bone cancer.

The Birdsell model
Early scholars had tended to view the peopling of Australia as the result of three separate waves of immigration, with distinct human types. Birdsell took a biological approach and did extensive work on anthropometrics to buttress his conjecture. This trihybrid model was resurrected and espoused by Birdsell, and became a standard part of Australian history down from the 1940s. It was adopted by the then doyen of Australian historians, Manning Clark in his 6 volume history of the country. In a recent polemic, Keith Windschuttle and Tom Gittin observed that the model had dropped from view, and attributed political motives to its disappearance off the popular and academic radar. McNiven and Russell argue that the trihybrid theory was discarded as the natural outcome of advances in archaeological work on the populating of the Australian continent, and that Birdwell's theory's initial popularity was due to the old colonial mentality informing opinion, which saw in the successive wave theory support for the dispossession (in a fourth wave) of Aboriginal people and to undermine native title claims.

In his seminal paper of 1977, "The recalibration of a paradigm for the first peopling of Greater Australia", he examined the standard models for the origins of Aboriginal Australians regarding how human migration from Southeast Asia could cross the Sahul barrier. Birdsell theorized a distinctive model challenging the accepted view, outlining three variants for a northerly model positing a route through Sulawesi, and two for a conduit to the southern continent via Timor.

Publications
His publications included:

 Birdsell, Joseph 1987. Some reflections on fifty years in biological anthropology in Annual Review of Anthropology 16(1):1-12.
 Norman B. Tindale and Joseph B. Birdsell, "Results of the Harvard-Adelaide Universities Anthropological Expedition, 1938-1939: Tasmanoid Tribes in North Queensland", Records of the South Australian Museum, 7 (1), 1941-3, pp 1–9
 Tindale and Birdsell, "Tasmanoid Tribes in North Queensland"
 Joseph Birdsell, "A preliminary report on the trihybrid origin of the Australian aborigines", American Journal of Physical Anthropology, 28 (3), 1941, p 6
 J. B. Birdsell, "Preliminary data on the trihybrid origin of the Australian Aborigines", Archaeology and Physical Anthropology in Oceania, 2 (2), 1967, pp 100–55;
 Joseph B. Birdsell, "Microevolutionary Patterns in Aboriginal Australia", Oxford University Press, New York, 1993. (Review)
 J. B. Birdsell and W. Boyd, "Blood groups in the Australian Aborigines", American Journal of Physical Anthropology, 27, 1940, pp 69–90;
 Joseph Birdsell, "Results of the Harvard-Adelaide Universities Anthropological Expedition, 1938-39: The racial origins of the extinct Tasmanians", Records of the Queen Victoria Museum, II (3), 1949
 J. B. Birdsell, "Human Evolution: An Introduction to the New Physical Anthropology", Houghton Mifflin, Boston (1972) (Amazon, Google books)
 J. B. Birdsell, Carleton S. Coon and Stanley M. Garn, "Races: a Study of Race formation in Man" (1950)

See also 
 Mbabaram people

Notes

Citations

Sources

1908 births
1994 deaths
Harvard University alumni
Massachusetts Institute of Technology alumni
20th-century American anthropologists